Devatha Manushya is a 1988 Indian Kannada-language film, directed by Singeetham Srinivasa Rao. The film stars Rajkumar, Geetha, K. S. Ashwath and Sudharani. The movie is famous for its evergreen songs, which were composed by Upendra Kumar.

This was Rajkumar's 200th movie - which initially should have been the historical Amoghavarsha Nrupathunga with the same director but subsequently dropped. The core plot of the movie is based on the 1861 English novel Silas Marner by George Eliot.

Plot
Krishna Murthy is a hard working driver who believes in living a simple life. His boss, a business tycoon, maintains a low profile about his business and does not reveal it to anybody. A high-profile robbery for a golden idol of Goddess has taken place and Krishna Murthy is blamed for it. Whether he will be able to break away from this blame and bring forward the criminal forms the rest of the story.

Cast

 Rajkumar as Krishna Murthy
 Geetha as Jaya
 Sudharani as Seetha
 K. S. Ashwath 
 Balakrishna
 Kanchana
 Sundar Krishna Urs
 Shivaram
 Rajanand as Kapanipati
 Hema Choudhary as Yamuna
 Shivaram
 Padma Kumta as Kaveramma

Soundtrack

Upendra Kumar composed the background score for the film and the soundtracks. Lyrics for the soundtracks were penned by Chi. Udaya Shankar. The album consists of five soundtracks.

Awards
 Karnataka State Film Awards 1988-89
 Best Actor - Rajkumar

References

External links

1988 films
1980s Kannada-language films
Films directed by Singeetam Srinivasa Rao
Films scored by Upendra Kumar
Films with screenplays by Chi. Udayashankar